Zhushan County is a county in Shiyan, northwestern Hubei province, China, bordering Shaanxi province to the north and Chongqing municipality to the south.

Toponymy 
Emperor Fei of the ancient state of Western Wei named the county Zhushan, meaning bamboo mountain.

History 
The area of present-day Zhushan County belonged to the Chu State until 611 BCE.

Republic of China 

In 1932, the Republic of China introduced , and the county belonged to the 11th Administrative Inspectorate of Hubei Province.

People's Republic of China 
On, January 20, 1948, the area was taken by the People's Liberation Army.

In 1965, it was once again moved to Yunyang Prefecture.

In October 1994, the area was reorganized as part of the newly-expanded prefecture-level city of Shiyan.

Geography 
Zhushan County is located in the northwestof Hubei province. Over 80% of the county is mountainous. The Du River flows through the county.

The county is bordered by Fang County to the east, Yunyang District and Baihe County in Shaanxi to the north, Zhuxi County and Xunyang County in Shaanxi to the west, and Shennongjia and Wuxi County in Chongqing to the south.

Climate

Administrative divisions
Zhushan County administers nine towns and eight townships. These township-level divisions then administer 254 village-level divisions.

References

Counties of Hubei
Shiyan